Le Populaire was a socialist daily newspaper published in France. It was the main organ of the French Section of the Workers' International (SFIO).

History and profile
Le Populaire was founded in 1918. In 1927 the paper began to be published daily.

Le Populaire was significantly weaker than its communist rival l'Humanité. Only during the period of 1936-1937 did the circulation of Le Populaire exceed 100,000.  With the German invasion of France in 1940, Le Populaire suspended publication.  Although it was resumed after the war, it never regained its prominence of the late 1930s and went into a strong decline during the 1960s, ceasing publication in 1970.

References

1920 establishments in France
1970 disestablishments in France
Newspapers established in 1920
Publications disestablished in 1970
Defunct newspapers published in France
Daily newspapers published in France
Socialist newspapers
French Section of the Workers' International